Albert "Bert" Nelson (born November 17, 1921, in San Diego, California – January 9, 1994)  was an American publisher and writer. In 1948, after graduating from the University of California, Berkeley he was a co-founder of Track & Field News, along with his brother Cordner. The upstart magazine's first headquarters were Cordner's garage in San Bruno, California. The magazine covers the sport of track and field and other aspects of the umbrella of athletics. The monthly magazine has declared itself to be "The Bible of the Sport".

Bert had run the 880 yard dash in high school and continued to the cross country team at Berkeley. Returning from the Navy after World War II he first got his feet wet starting a small newspaper before the brothers began the magazine. Bert became one of the top writers of the sport.

Starting in 1960 he established TAFNEWS Press, which went on to become the nation's leading track and field publisher. The company has over 100 titles. The first of those was the Little Red Book. Within the sport, the book was as important as Chairman Mao's Book, but this book provided conversions between the metric system that are used in the sport worldwide and the imperial units that are still common in America. The next book was the Little Gold Book which converted decathlon scores.

Nelson was inducted into the National Track and Field Hall of Fame in 1991.

References

1994 deaths
1921 births
Businesspeople from San Diego
American male journalists
American magazine editors
American magazine founders
Sportswriters from California
Track and field athletes from California
20th-century American non-fiction writers
Sport of athletics journalists
Track and field people from California
20th-century American male writers
20th-century American businesspeople
University of California, Berkeley alumni
United States Navy personnel of World War II